Walter P. Nunn (16 January 1920 – 1965) was an English professional footballer who played as a wing half in the Football League for Swindon Town.

Before World War II, Nunn was on the books at Bexleyheath & Welling and Charlton Athletic, although he made no first-team appearances for Charlton. He joined Swindon Town after the war, where he made his Football League debut in the 1947–48 season. After four appearances, he joined Colchester United in the Southern League, and later signed for league rivals Guildford City.

Career
Born in Deptford, London, Nunn's playing career began with Bexleyheath and Welling. Immediately before the outbreak of World War II, Nunn was signed to Charlton Athletic, but he made no first-team appearances for the club.

After the war, Nunn had joined Swindon Town. He made his Football League debut during the 1947–48 season, going on the make a further three appearances across the campaign.

Ahead of the 1948–49 season, Colchester United manager Jimmy Allen brought Nunn to the Southern League club, making his debut on 21 August 1948 in a 1–1 draw at Cheltenham Town. He made ten league and two league cup appearances during the season, but refused terms to remain with Colchester for the 1949–50 season, instead opting to join league rivals Guildford City.

References

1920 births
1965 deaths
Footballers from Deptford
Association football wing halves
English footballers
Charlton Athletic F.C. players
Swindon Town F.C. players
Colchester United F.C. players
Guildford City F.C. players
English Football League players
Southern Football League players